Close the Door may refer to:

 Close the Door (song), by Teddy Pendergrass, 1978
 "Close the Door", a song by Bulldog Mansion from Funk
 "Close the Door", a song by Montell Jordan from This Is How We Do It
 "Close the Door", a song by Shinee from Everybody
 Close the Door campaign, an energy conservation campaign in the United Kingdom